Harikumar is an Indian film script writer and director in Malayalam movies. He did script, story and dialogue for more than 20 Malayalam movies. He directed popular movies Sukrutham, Ayanum and Udhyanapalakan, which won many awards, even in international festivals. He was the member of National Award Jury in 2005 and 2008.

Partial filmography

As director

Story
 Aambalppoovu (1981)
 Snehapoorvam Meera (1982)
 Oru Swakaaryam (1983)
 Puli Varunne Puli (1985)
 Ezhunnellathu (1991)
 Kallan Kappalil Thanne (1992)

Screenplay
 Snehapoorvam Meera (1982)
 Oru Swakaaryam (1983)
 Puli Varunne Puli (1985)
 Ayanam (1985)
 Pularvettam (2001)

Dialogue
 Oru Swakaaryam (1983)
 Puli Varunne Puli (1985)
 Pularvettam (2001)

References

External links

Malayalam screenwriters
Malayalam film directors
Living people
Year of birth missing (living people)
Place of birth missing (living people)
20th-century Indian film directors
21st-century Indian film directors
20th-century Indian dramatists and playwrights
21st-century Indian dramatists and playwrights